Emilio García may refer to:

Emilio García Gómez (1905–1995), Spanish Arabist, literary historian and critic
Emilio García Riera (1931–2002), Spanish-Mexican actor, writer and cinema critic
Emilio Garcia (actor) actor in Filipino film and TV productions such as Sugo, Mundo man ay magunaw and Reputasyon
Emilio García (rower) (born 1938), Spanish athlete who competed in rowing at the 1960 Summer Olympics
Emilio García (footballer) (born 1994), Mexican footballer
Emilio Garcia (artist) (born 1981), Spanish sculptor and painter